Cherrydale may refer to:

Cherrydale, Arlington County, Virginia, a neighborhood
Cherrydale Volunteer Fire House
Cherrydale (Turkey, North Carolina), a NRHP-listed house
Cherrydale (Greenville, South Carolina), a historic house